Sulo may refer to:

People
 Sulo (singer) (born 1969), Swedish vocalist and songwriter
 Sulo Aittoniemi (1936–2016), Finnish politician
 Sulo Bärlund (1910–1986), Finnish shot putter
 Sulo Cederström (1903–1944), Finnish sports shooter
 Sulo Heino (1908–1996), Finnish athlete
 Sulo Jääskeläinen (1890–1942), Finnish skier
 Sulo Leppänen (1916–2015), Finnish wrestler
 Sulo Nurmela (1908–1999), Finnish cross-country skier
 Sulo Parkkinen (1930–2013), Finnish football player
 Sulo Salmi (1914–1984), Finnish gymnast
 Sulo Salo (1909–1995), Finnish football player
 Sulo Suorttanen (1921–2005), Finnish politician
 Sulo Teittinen (1882–1964), Finnish politician
 Sulo Vaattovaara (born 1967), Swedish football player

Other
 SULO (Australian rock band)